Isaac Hawkins Browne may refer to 
Isaac Hawkins Browne (poet) (1705–1760), English politician and poet
Isaac Hawkins Browne (coalowner) (1745–1818), English politician and industrialist, son of the above